WASP-34, also named Amansinaya, is a sunlike star of spectral type G5V that has 1.01 ± 0.07 times the mass and 0.93 ± 0.12 times the diameter of the Sun. It rotates on its axis every 34 ± 15 days, indicating it is around 6.7 billion years old.

Planetary system
It has a planet 0.59 ± 0.01 times as massive as Jupiter that takes 4.317 days to complete an orbit. Planetary color was found to be redder than usual, hinting on peculiar chemistry. The planet has a large measured temperature difference between dayside (1185 K) and nightside (726 K).

There is increasing evidence that there is a massive object orbiting the system further out.

Naming
In 2019 the IAU announced as part of NameExoWorlds that WASP-34 and its planet WASP-34b would be given official names chosen by school children from The Philippines. The star is named Amansinaya, after Aman Sinaya, which is one of the two trinity deities of the Philippine's Tagalog mythology, and is the primordial deity of the ocean and protector of fisherman. The planet WASP-34b is named Haik. Haik is the successor of the primordial Aman Sinaya as the god of the sea of the Philippine's Tagalog mythology.

References

External links
 WASP primary website

Crater (constellation)
Planetary systems with one confirmed planet
G-type main-sequence stars
Amansinaya
J11013589-2351382
34
Durchmusterung objects